Emporia is the plural form of the Latin emporium may refer to:

Places in the United States 
 Emporia, Florida
 Emporia, Indiana
 Emporia, Kansas
 Emporia, Virginia

Other uses 
 Emporia (early medieval), a type of trading settlement
 Emporia (moth), a genus of snout moths
 Emporia (shopping mall), a shopping mall in Malmö in southern Sweden
 , a frigate of the US Navy

See also 
 Emporio (disambiguation)
 Emporion, Catalonia, Spain
 Emporium (disambiguation)